Yvette Bonapart (born 5 January 1965) is a Surinamese sprinter. She competed in the women's 100 metres at the 1988 Summer Olympics. She was the first woman to represent Suriname at the Olympics.

References

External links
 

1965 births
Living people
Athletes (track and field) at the 1988 Summer Olympics
Surinamese female sprinters
Olympic athletes of Suriname
Place of birth missing (living people)
Olympic female sprinters